Ellen Miller may refer to:
 Ellen Miller (artist), American painter, designer, author, and needleworker
 Ellen Miller (Lassie), a fictional character on the television series Lassie
 Ellen S. Miller, American political activist
 Ellen Sue Miller (1967–2008), American fiction writer